The Making of the English Working Class is a work of English social history written by E. P. Thompson, a New Left historian. It was first published in 1963 by Victor Gollancz Ltd, and republished in revised form in 1968 by Pelican, after which it became an early Open University set book. It concentrates on English artisan and working-class society "in its formative years 1780 to 1832".

It was placed 30th in the Modern Library 100 Best Nonfiction books of the 20th century.

Overview

Its tone is captured by the oft-quoted line from the preface: "I am seeking to rescue the poor stockinger, the Luddite cropper, the "obsolete" hand-loom weaver, the "utopian" artisan, and even the deluded follower of Joanna Southcott, from the enormous condescension of posterity."

Thompson attempts to add a humanist element to social history, being critical of those who turn the people of the working class into an inhuman statistical bloc. Those people were not just the victims of history, and Thompson displays them as being in control of their own making: "The working class made itself as much as it was made." He also discusses the popular movements that are often forgotten in history, such as obscure Jacobin societies like the London Corresponding Society. Thompson makes great effort to recreate the life experience of the working class, which is what often marks the work out as so influential.

Thompson uses the term "working class", rather than "classes", throughout the book to emphasize the growth of a working-class consciousness. He claims in the Preface that "in the years between 1780 and 1832 most English working people came to feel an identity of interests as between themselves, and as against other men whose interests are different from (and usually opposed to) theirs". This change in consciousness is exemplified in Thompson's 1975 book on the 1723 Waltham Black Act. The Black act was a newly imposed forestry law and legislation in Great Britain, that changed the way "the King's forests" had been managed traditionally, Thompson cited the Waltham forest, north of round London, as an example of rising tensions between local hunters, "farmers, cottagers and other foresters" and the Whigs. Traditionally these farmers and others had some rights and privileges to grow crops on small holdings but it was illegal for them to kill or harm "the King's deer" for profit, food, or even to protect their crops from the deer. Tensions has escalated as 18th century nouveau riche who held new leases in Waltham began to violate the traditional rights of the local population by enclosing their ever expanding estates and surrounding gardens with fences. In response, under the leadership of a Robin Hood-like figure, a small group of local people began to respond to each act by the Whigs that hurt or dispossessed the local people, by killing a deer, burning a barn, etc. Although they were not poachers as they did not the harvest, they also blackened their faces to be invisible at night. They became known as the Blacks. The 1723 Black Act was a long and detailed list of new crimes for which the local people could be legally punished. Thompson decried this inequity and detailed the widespread corruption that enabled the passage of the bill, specifically the role of "Robert Walpole and the Whig administration in the passing and implementation of the Act".

Thompson's re-evaluation of the Luddite movement and his unsympathetic treatment of the influence of the early Methodist movement on working-class aspirations are also particularly memorable. (Thompson's parents were Methodist missionaries.)

Thompson's theories on working-class consciousness are at the core of his work, and the working class's agency was manifested by its core values of solidarity, collectivism, mutuality, political radicalism and Methodism. Thompson wished to disassociate Marxism from Stalinism and his injection of humanistic principles in the book was his way of steering the left towards democratic socialism, as opposed to totalitarianism.

Reception
Sidney Pollard called the book "without a doubt, a landmark in English historiography". Robert K. Webb called it "both very important and extremely exasperating". David Eastwood argued that it "transformed the study of labour, class and political radicalism in Britain and America and is incontestably the single most influential work of history of the post-war period".

Geoffrey Best called it a "valuable and exciting book" but noted Thompson's neglect of the "flag-saluting, foreigner-hating, peer-respecting side of the plebeian mind" and asked, "How large a portion of 'the working class' did those 'artisans' form from whom so much of his evidence necessarily comes, and of how many hundreds of thousands of lower-class folk do we remain so much more ignorant that we cannot speak as confidently about them?"

In April 2020, Jacobin magazine launched a podcast series, Casualties of History, focusing on the book.

References

Further reading
R. Currie and R. M. Hartwell, "The Making of the English Working Class?", The Economic History Review, New Series, Vol. 18, No. 3 (1965), pp. 633–643.
F. K. Donnelly, "Ideology and Early English Working-Class History: Edward Thompson and His Critics", Social History, Vol. 1, No. 2 (May 1976), pp. 219–238.
David Eastwood, "E. P. Thompson, Britain, and the French Revolution", History Workshop Journal, No. 39 (Spring, 1995), pp. 79–88.

External links
The Making of the English Working Class at Penguin Books.

The Making of the English Working Class – E.P. Thompson | libcom.org

1963 non-fiction books
1968 non-fiction books
20th-century history books
Books about the Industrial Revolution
History books about England
Books about England
Books about labor history
Methodism in England
Marxist books
Victor Gollancz Ltd books
Working class in England